The Battle of Buffington Island, also known as the St. Georges Creek Skirmish, was an American Civil War engagement in Meigs County, Ohio, and Jackson County, West Virginia, on July 19, 1863, during Morgan's Raid. The largest battle in Ohio during the war, Buffington Island contributed to the capture of the famed Confederate cavalry raider, Brig. Gen. John H. Morgan, who was seeking to escape Union army pursuers across the Ohio River at a ford opposite Buffington Island.

Delayed overnight, Morgan was almost surrounded by Union cavalry the next day, and the resulting battle ended in a Confederate rout, with over half of the 1,930-man Confederate force being captured. General Morgan and some 700 men escaped, but the daring raid finally ended on July 26 with his surrender after the Battle of Salineville. Morgan's Raid was of little military consequence, but it did spread terror among much of the population of southern and eastern Ohio, as well as neighboring Indiana.

Background
Hoping to divert the attention of the Federal Army of the Ohio from Southern forces in Tennessee, Brig. Gen. John H. Morgan and 2,460 Confederate cavalrymen, along with a battery of horse artillery, rode west from Sparta, Tennessee, on June 11, 1863. Twelve days later, when a second Federal army (the Army of the Cumberland) began its Tullahoma Campaign, Morgan decided it was time to move northward. His column marched into Kentucky, fighting a series of minor battles, before commandeering two steamships to ferry them across the Ohio River into Indiana (against orders), where, at the Battle of Corydon, Morgan routed the local militia. With his path now relatively clear, Morgan headed eastward on July 13 past Cincinnati and rode across southern Ohio, stealing horses and supplies along the way.

The Union response was not long in coming, as Maj. Gen. Ambrose Burnside, commanding the Department of the Ohio, ordered out all available troops, as well as sending several Union Navy gunboats steaming up the Ohio River to contest any Confederate attempt to reach Kentucky or West Virginia and safety. Brig. Gen. Edward H. Hobson led several columns of Federal cavalry in pursuit of Morgan's raiders, which by now had been reduced to some 1,930 men. Ohio Governor David Tod called out the local militia, and volunteers formed companies to protect towns and river crossings throughout the region.

On July 18, Morgan, having split his column earlier, led his reunited force towards Middleport, Ohio, a quiet river town near the Eight Mile Island Ford, where Morgan intended to cross into West Virginia. Running a gauntlet of small arms fire, Morgan's men were denied access to the river and to Middleport itself (which had a ferry), and he headed towards the next ford upstream at Buffington Island, some 20 miles to the southeast.

Arriving near Buffington Island and the nearby tiny hamlet of Portland, Ohio, towards evening on July 18, Morgan found that the ford was blocked by several hundred local militia ensconced behind hastily constructed earthworks. As a dense fog and darkness settled in, Morgan decided to camp for the night to allow his jaded men and horses to rest. He was concerned that even if he pushed aside the enemy troops, he might lose additional men in the darkness as they tried to navigate the narrow ford. The delay proved to be a fatal mistake.

Fitch's Fleet

The US Navy's Mississippi Squadron was involved in Battle of Buffington Island. Morgan had brought field cannons with his column. A heavy river blockade and a means was realized early in the chase while Morgan's column traveled easterly towards Cincinnati, Ohio.  Lt Commander Leroy Fitch's fleet included the Brilliant, Fairplay, Moose, Reindeer, St. Clair, Silver Lake, Springfield, Victory, Naumkeag, and Queen City, which were tinclads and gunboats. A few of these steamers lagged behind to zone-up protecting against a possible doubling back of Morgan's column.  The forward vessels were each assigned a patrol zone along the Mason, Jackson and Wood counties of West Virginia by Fitch's instruction. Naumkeag patrolled from Point Pleasant, West Virginia to Eight Mile Island zone and Springfield guarded from Pomeroy, Ohio towards Letart Islands. Victory'''s cannon balls have been found along Leading Creek, Ohio, its patrol from Middleport, Ohio to Eight Mile Island along the West Virginia river bank. The Magnolia, Imperial, Alleghany Belle, and Union tinclads and armed packets which were privateers along with others documented under Parkersburg Logistics' command. The Army's "amphibious division" officer, Major General Ambrose E. Burnside at his Cincinnati headquarters, provided intelligence of Morgan's march and turned his flagship, Alleghany Belle, over to Fitch before the battle. The "amphibious division" tinclads had four to six large jonboats (sideboats) used to fire rifles from, for landing to give chase and pickup prisoners.

Fitch's flagship was the gunboat USS Moose. Moose and Fitch's dispatch privateer, Imperial, were tied up within earshot of the island the night before the battle. It has been written that Fitch had the boilers fired up and shooting its large cannons at the island on first rifle fire, slightly out of range before steam could make way. Allegheny Belle was  a little farther down tied up along the Ohio side. Having heard Mooses cannons, it made steam and soon brought up Burnsides' "amphibious infantry" (M. F. Jenkins 1999).

Continuing upstream after the main battle dissolved into skirmishes, Moose fired on a Confederate artillery column trying to cross the river above the island at the next shoal crossing. Fitch dispatched Imperial to recover Confederate field artillery left behind there. All along the river, spotty gunboat and field cannon fire with clusters of rifle fire was heard shooting at Morgan's scouts looking for another possible ford. Meanwhile, Parkersburg logistics terminal had sent a local armed packet with 9th Infantry sentries below Blennerhassett Island on word of the Battle's gunfire some twenty miles below. These paralleled patrols opposite the Belpre, Ohio, Union Army encampment below the Ohio side of the terminal. This steamboat river harbor and large land debarkations camp blocked Morgan's further attempt to ford the river upstream turning his retreat northerly and away from this Ohio River area. The local support vessels were busy hauling ammunition, rations and prisoners. Belpre, Ohio had a supply receiving dockage and depot.

Battle

On the foggy morning of July 19, a Federal brigades under Henry M. Judah (1,100 men) finally caught up with Morgan and attacked his position on the broad flood plain just north of Portland, as another column under Edward Hobson (450 men) arrived on the scene. In the spirited early fighting, Maj. Daniel McCook, the 65-year-old patriarch of the famed Fighting McCooks, was mortally wounded.  In addition, two Union gunboats, the U.S.S. Moose and the Allegheny Belle, steamed into the narrow channel separating Buffington Island from the flood plain and opened fire on Morgan's men, spraying them with shell fragments. Soon they were joined by a third gunboat.  Also brought onto the field were 970 infantrymen under Eliakim Scammon, although this force was not actively engaged.  Therefore only 1,550 Federals were engaged with Morgan's exhausted men.

Morgan, his way to the Buffington Island ford now totally blocked, left behind a small rear guard and tried to fight his way northward along the flood plain, hoping to reach yet another ford. It proved to be an exercise in futility, as Morgan's force was split apart by the converging Federal columns and 52 Confederates were killed, with well over one hundred badly wounded in the swirling fighting. Morgan and about 700 men escaped encirclement by following a narrow path through the woods.  However, his brother-in-law and second-in-command, Col. Basil W. Duke, was captured, as were 71 of Morgan's cavalrymen, including his younger brother John Morgan. Duke formally surrendered to Col. Isaac Garrard of the 7th Ohio Cavalry.

Morgan's beleaguered troops soon headed upstream for the unguarded ford opposite Belleville, West Virginia, where over 300 men successfully crossed the Ohio River to avoid capture, most notably Col. Adam "Stovepipe" Johnson and famed telegrapher George Ellsworth. General Morgan, who was halfway across the ford, noted with dismay that his remaining men were trapped on the Ohio side as the Federal gunboats suddenly loomed into view. He wheeled his horse midchannel and rejoined what was left of his column on the Ohio riverbank. Over the next few days, they failed to find a secure place to cross the river, and Morgan's remaining force was captured on July 26 in northern Ohio following the Battle of Salineville.

Many of those captured at Buffington Island were taken via steamboat to Cincinnati as prisoners of war, including most of the wounded. Morgan and most of his officers were confined to the Ohio Penitentiary in Columbus. Morgan, Thomas Hines, and a few others would later escape and return safely to Kentucky.

Battlefield preservation

Comparatively little changed on the Buffington Island battlefield in the first century after the fighting; the only substantial difference was the placement of a stone obelisk marking the battle.  In 1929, the Ohio Historical Society took ownership of the property.  In 1970, the battlefield was listed on the National Register of Historic Places.  Embracing approximately  near the river, the designated portion of the battlefield was the county's first location to be recognized as this type of historic site.  There are threats to the site as gravel mining operations have been allowed.  The current organization working to preserve the battlefield is the Buffington Island Battlefield Preservation Foundation.  Recently 117 acres have been saved by the efforts of the American Battlefield Trust.

References

Bibliography

 Bennett, B. Kevin and Roth, David, "Battle of Buffington Island," Blue & Gray magazine, April 1998. 
 Cahill, Lora Schmidt and Mowery, David L., Morgan's Raid Across Ohio: The Civil War Guidebook of the John Hunt Morgan Heritage Trail. Columbus, Ohio: The Ohio Historical Society, 2014. .
 Duke, Basil Wilson, A History of Morgan's Cavalry. Cincinnati, Ohio: Miami Printing and Pub. Co., 1867. On-line version
 Horwitz, Lester V., The Longest Raid of the Civil War. Cincinnati, Ohio: Farmcourt Publishing, Inc., 1999. .
 Mowery, David L., Morgan's Great Raid: The Remarkable Expedition from Kentucky to Ohio.'' Charleston, South Carolina: The History Press, 2013. .

External links
Buffington Island Battlefield Preservation Foundation
Buffington Island Battlefield Memorial Park - Ohio History Connection
Update to the Civil War Sites Advisory Commission Report on the Nation’s Civil War Battlefields
Martin Lowery Buffington Island webpage [Archived]
The Fight to Save Buffington Island Battlefield [Archived]
Buffington Island Battlefield Archaeological Project - Heidelberg University [Archived]

National Register of Historic Places in Meigs County, Ohio
Geography of Meigs County, Ohio
Ohio History Connection
Jackson County, West Virginia
Meigs County, Ohio
Buffington
Morgan's Raid
Buffington Island
Buffington Island
Buffington Island
Buffington
1863 in Ohio
1863 in West Virginia
July 1863 events